This article focuses on the views of certain Christian commentators and theologians. For a more general account of the topic of Genesis chapter 1, see Genesis creation narrative.

The framework interpretation (also known as the literary framework view, framework theory, or framework hypothesis) is a description of the  structure of the first chapter of the Book of Genesis (more precisely Genesis 1:1–2:4a), the Genesis creation narrative. Biblical scholars and theologians present the structure as evidence that Gen. 1 presents a symbolic, rather than literal, presentation of creation.

The following table illustrates the proposed  framework:

Two triads and three kingdoms

Genesis 1 divides its six days of Creation into two groups of three ("triads"). The introduction, Genesis 1:1–2, "In the beginning… the earth was without form and void, and darkness was upon the face of the deep…", describes the primal universe containing darkness, a watery "deep", and a formless earth, over which hovers the spirit of God. The following three days describe the first triad: the creation of light and its separation from the primal darkness (Gen. 1:3–5); the creation of the "firmament" within the primal waters so that the heavens (space between the firmament and the surface of the seas) and the "waters under the firmament" can appear (Gen. 1:6–8); and the separation of the waters under the firmament into seas and dry land with its plants and trees. The second triad describes the peopling of the three elements of the first: sun, moon, and stars for the day and night (Gen. 1:14–19), fish and birds for the heavens and seas (Gen. 1:20–23), and finally animals and man for the vegetated land (24–31).

Differences exist on how to classify the two triads, but Meredith G. Kline's analysis is suggestive: the first triad (days 1–3) narrate the establishment of the creation kingdoms, and the second triad (days 4–6), the production of the creature kinds.  Furthermore, this structure is not without theological significance, for all the created realms and regents of the six days are subordinate vassals of God who takes His royal Sabbath rest as the Creator King on the seventh day. Thus the seventh day marks the climax of the creation week.

Supporters and critics
The framework interpretation is held by many theistic evolutionists and some progressive creationists. Some argue that it had a precedent in the writings of the early church father St. Augustine. Dr. Arie Noordzij of the University of Utrecht was the first proponent of the Framework Hypothesis in 1924. Nicolaas Ridderbos (not to be confused with his more well-known brother, Herman Nicolaas Ridderbos) popularized the view in the late 1950s. It has gained acceptance in modern times through the work of such theologians and scholars as Meredith G. Kline, Henri Blocher, John H. Walton and Bruce Waltke.

Old Testament and Pentateuch scholar Gordon Wenham supports a schematic interpretation of Genesis 1 in his two volume, scholarly commentary on Genesis.

The framework view has been successful in the modern era because it resolves the traditional conflict between the Genesis creation narrative and science. It presents an alternative to literalistic interpretations of the Genesis narratives, which are advocated by some conservative Christians and Creationists at a popular level. Creationists who take a literalist approach have laid the charge that Christians who interpret Genesis symbolically or allegorically are assigning science an authority over that of Scripture. Advocates of the framework view respond by noting that Scripture affirms God's general revelation in nature, and therefore in our search for the truth about the origins of the universe we must be sensitive to both the "book of words" (Scripture) and the "book of works" (nature).  Since God is the author of both "books", we should expect that they do not conflict with each other when properly interpreted.

The framework interpretation is rejected by some biblical scholars, such as James Barr, Andrew Steinmann, Robert McCabe, and Ting Wang,  Some systematic theologians have criticised the framework interpretation, such as Wayne Grudem and Millard Erickson—deeming it an unsuitable reading of the Genesis text.

See also
Allegorical interpretations of Genesis
Theistic evolution
Creation–evolution controversy

References

Bibliography

 
 
 

 .

External links
  (advocating the framework view).
  (describing the framework view and its general agreement with Catholic teaching).
 

Christian creationism
Book of Genesis